The 2018 London Marathon was the 38th running of the annual marathon race in London, England, which took place on Sunday, 22 April. Kenyans Eliud Kipchoge and Vivian Cheruiyot won elite races. In the wheelchair races, Britain's David Weir and Australia's Madison de Rozario topped the podium.

Around 386,050 people applied to enter the race: 54,685 had their applications accepted and 40,926 started the race. These were all record highs for the race. A total of 40,179 runners, 23,701 men and 16,478 women, finished the race. The race was formally started by Queen Elizabeth.

In the under-17 Mini Marathon, the 3-mile able-bodied and wheelchair events were won by Luke Duffy (14:24), Cera Gemmell (16:38), Zhou Zien (13:05) and Kare Adenegan (12:37).

Overview
On 23 March 2018, London Marathon Limited, the organisers of the event announced that the Queen would formally start the race by "step[ping] onto a special podium in front of the Round Tower in the grounds of Windsor Castle to push the start button at 10:00 a.m." The formality marked the anniversary of the 1908 Olympic Marathon, which was started at the same venue by the then Princess Mary, who is The Queen's grandmother. It marked the third time a member of the royal family has started the race, held annually since 1981.

With hot weather forecast, the organisers told racers to lower their performance goals and reconsider fancy dress which could lead to overheating. Extra water and cooling showers were added along the route.

One runner, 29-year-old Masterchef semi-finalist and professional chef Matt Campbell, died after collapsing during the race.

The men's elite race saw the second-ever entry into a competitive marathon by British runner Mo Farah, who, despite a mix-up at a water station, managed to finish third in a new British record. The race winner, Eliud Kipchoge, was on pace for a world record, but slowed in the final stages, finishing with a time of 2:04:17.

Both Mary Keitany and Tirunesh Dibaba went into the women's elite race aiming to set a new world record for a women's marathon with male pacemakers. Keitany led on a world-record pace for much of the race, but faded in the final few miles to eventually finish fifth. Dibaba also struggled as the race progressed and failed to finish. The race winner was Vivian Cheruiyot in a time of 2:18:31.

David Weir won the men's wheelchair event for a record extending eighth time, while Commonwealth Champion Madison de Rozario claimed a surprise first win in London in the women's event.

Results

Men

Women

Wheelchair men

Wheelchair women

References

Results
Virgin Money London Marathon 2018 Tracking and Results. London Marathon. Retrieved 2020-05-03.
London Marathon — Kipchoge & Cheruiyot Handle Heat Best. Track and Field News (2018-04-22). Retrieved 2020-05-03.

External links 

2018
London Marathon
London Marathon
London Marathon